Lisa Rene Cummins is a Barbadian politician. She is a senator in the Senate of Barbados. She currently serves as the Minister of Energy and Business including International Business in the Mia Mottley administration.

References 

Living people
21st-century Barbadian politicians
Barbados Labour Party politicians
Government ministers of Barbados
Barbadian women ambassadors
Members of the Senate of Barbados
Year of birth missing (living people)
21st-century Barbadian women politicians
Women government ministers of Barbados